Earle Dickson (October 10, 1892—September 21, 1961) was an American inventor best known for inventing adhesive bandages in the US. He lived in Highland Park, New Jersey, for a large portion of his life.

Biography
Dickson was a cotton buyer at the Johnson & Johnson company. His wife, Josephine Knight, often cut herself while doing housework and cooking. Dickson found that gauze placed on a wound with tape did not stay on her active fingers. In 1920, he placed squares of gauze in intervals on a roll of tape, held in place with crinoline. James Wood Johnson, his boss, liked the idea, and put it into production. In 1924, Johnson & Johnson installed machines to mass-produce the once handmade bandages. Following the commercial success of his design, Dickson was promoted to vice president.

References

External links
The story as told by Johnson & Johnson
Earle Dickson from the Lemuelson-MIT Program

American corporate directors
1892 births
1961 deaths
20th-century American engineers
20th-century American inventors
People from Highland Park, New Jersey